The Elizabeth Sterling Haynes Award (also known as the Sterling Award) is a local Edmonton, Alberta award presented annually which honours excellence in theatre. The award covers a number of categories, including production, performance, direction, writing, choreography, and design, as well as a special award recognizing achievement in theatre administration.

Named after Elizabeth Sterling Haynes, who helped establish and nurture Edmonton professional theatre in the early 20th century, the award was established in 1987. Each winner receives a metal statuette, plated in silver.

Past winners have included Loretta Bailey, Ronnie Burkett, Tantoo Cardinal, Brent Carver, Marty Chan, Jeff Haslam, Martha Henry, Stewart Lemoine and Stephen Ouimette.

See also
 Jessie Richardson Theatre Award
 Dora Mavor Moore Award
 Dora Audience Choice Award
 Floyd S. Chalmers Canadian Play Award

References

External links
 Official site
Canadian Theatre Encyclopedia

Canadian theatre awards
Theatre in Edmonton
1987 establishments in Alberta
Alberta awards